Amblyomma tonelliae is a species of tick of the genus Amblyomma. The species is associated with dry areas of the Chaco region, spanning central-northern Argentina to Bolivia and Paraguay. Rickettsia species can habitate A. tonelliae endosymbiotically.

It is named after Maria Tonelli-Rondelli.

References

Further reading
Estrada-Peña, Agustín, et al. "Divergent environmental preferences and areas of sympatry of tick species in the Amblyomma cajennense complex (Ixodidae)." International journal for parasitology 44.14 (2014): 1081–1089.
Martins, Thiago F., et al. "Taxonomic key to nymphs of the genus Amblyomma (Acari: Ixodidae) in Argentina, with description and redescription of the nymphal stage of four Amblyomma species." Ticks and tick-borne diseases 5.6 (2014): 753–770.

Amblyomma
Animals described in 2014
Arachnids of South America